Leicestershire County Cricket Club is one of eighteen first-class county clubs within the domestic cricket structure of England and Wales. It represents the historic county of Leicestershire. It has also been representative of the county of Rutland. The club's limited overs team is called the Leicestershire Foxes. Founded in 1879, the club had minor county status until 1894 when it was promoted to first-class status pending its entry into the County Championship in 1895. Since then, Leicestershire have played in every top-level domestic cricket competition in England.

The club is based at Grace Road, Leicester, known as Uptonsteel County Ground and have also played home games at Aylestone Road in Leicester, at Hinckley, Loughborough, Melton Mowbray, Ashby-de-la-Zouch, Coalville, Uppingham and Oakham inside the traditional county boundaries.

In limited overs cricket, the kit colours are red with black trim in the Royal London One Day Cup and black with red trim in the T20. The shirt sponsors are Oval Insurance Broking with Highcross Leicester (shopping centre) on the top reverse side of the shirt.

Leicestershire are in the second division of the County Championship and in the north group of the Royal London One Day Cup. They recently finished bottom of the County Championship for the sixth time since the introduction of two divisions. Their best showing in recent years has been in the Twenty20 Cup with the Foxes winning the trophy three times in eight years.

Honours

First XI honours
 County Championship (3) – 1975, 1996, 1998
Runners-up (2) – 1982, 1994
 Sunday/National League (2) – 1974, 1977
Runners-up: 1972, 2001 
 Gillette Cup/NatWest/C&G Trophy/Friends Provident Trophy 
Runners-up: 1992, 2001 
 Twenty20 Cup/Friends Life t20 (3) – 2004, 2006, 2011
 Benson & Hedges Cup (3) – 1972, 1975, 1985
Runners-up: 1974, 1998

Second XI honours
 Second XI Championship (1) – 1983, 2014
Runners-up: 1961, 1975 
 Second XI Trophy (5) – 1993, 1995, 1996, 2000, 2014
 Second XI Twenty20 Cup (1) – 2014 
 Minor Counties Championship (1) – 1931
 Under-25 Competition(2) – 1975, 1985
+ 1 Bain Hogg Trophy – second XI one-day competition – 1996

History

Earliest cricket
Cricket may not have reached Leicestershire until well into the 18th century.  A notice in the Leicester Journal dated 17 August 1776 is the earliest known mention of cricket in the county. Soon afterwards, a Leicestershire and Rutland Cricket Club was taking part in important matches, mainly against Nottingham Cricket Club and Marylebone Cricket Club (MCC).  This club was prominent from 1781 until the beginning of the 19th century.

19th century
Little more is heard of Leicestershire cricket until the formation of the present club on 25 March 1879.

Essex CCC versus Leicestershire CCC at Leyton on 14, 15 & 16 May 1894 was the first first-class match for both clubs.  In 1895, the County Championship was restructured into a 14-team competition with the introduction of Essex, Leicestershire and Warwickshire CCC.

Early and mid-20th century
Leicestershire's first 70 years were largely spent in lower table mediocrity, with few notable exceptions. In 1953, the motivation of secretary-captain Charles Palmer lifted the side fleetingly to third place, but most of the rest of the 1950s was spent propping up the table, or thereabouts.

Start of improvement: The late 1950s and the 1960s
Change came in the late 1950s with the recruitment of the charismatic Willie Watson at the end of a distinguished career with England and Yorkshire. Watson's run gathering sparked the home-grown Maurice Hallam into becoming one of England's best opening batsmen. In bowling, Leicestershire had an erratically successful group of seamers in Terry Spencer, Brian Boshier, John Cotton and Jack van Geloven, plus the spin of John Savage.

Another change was in the captaincy: Tony Lock, the former England and Surrey spinner who had galvanised Western Australia.

The 1970s and the first golden era
Ray Illingworth, again from Yorkshire, instilled self-belief to the extent that the county took its first ever trophy in 1972, the Benson & Hedges Cup with Chris Balderstone man of the match. This was start of the first golden era as the first of five trophies in five years and included Leicestershire's first ever County Championship title in 1975. A couple of runners up spots were also thrown in.

The game when Leicestershire won their first ever County Championship, on 15 September 1975, marked something of a personal triumph for Chris Balderstone. Batting on 51 not out against Derbyshire at Chesterfield, after close of play he changed into his football kit to play for Doncaster Rovers in an evening match 30 miles away (a 1–1 draw with Brentford). Thus he is the only player to have played League Football and first class cricket on the same day. He then returned to Chesterfield to complete a century the following morning and take three wickets to wrap up the title. To add to that season's success for Leicestershire was a second Benson & Hedges victory.

The 1980s
A runners up spot in the 1982 County Championship brought some respectability, but the decade's only first class silverware was in the 1985 Benson & Hedges Cup with Balderstone still on board making him the most successful trophy winner in the club's history with six.

Success in the late 1990s
Leicestershire won the county championship in 1996, and again in 1998. This was an amazing achievement considering the resources of the club compared to other county teams. This Leicestershire side, led by Jack Birkenshaw and James Whitaker, used team spirit and togetherness to get the best out of a group of players who were either discarded from other counties or brought through the Leicestershire ranks.

This team did not have many stars, but Aftab Habib, Darren Maddy, Vince Wells, Jimmy Ormond, Alan Mullally and Chris Lewis all had chances for England. West Indian all-rounder Phil Simmons was also named as one of Wisden's Cricketers of the year in 1997 while playing for the club.

2000 and beyond: Twenty20 success and four-day struggles
The advent of Twenty20 cricket saw Leicestershire find a new source of success, winning the domestic T20 competition in 2004, 2006 and 2011. However, in the era of two-division County Championship cricket they have found success more difficult to come by, having not played in the top division since 2003 and been regular "wooden spoon" contenders. In 2013 and 2014 they finished without a single Championship win, the first team to achieve this unwanted feat in back to back seasons since Northamptonshire just before World War II.

Grounds

Current
 Grace Road, Leicester (1877 – present)
 Oakham School, Oakham (2000 – present)

Previous
 Bath Grounds, Ashby-de-la-Zouch (1912–1964)
 Kirkby Road, Barwell (1946–1947)
 Fox and Goose Ground, Coalville (1913–1914)
 Town Ground, Coalville (1950)
 Snibston Colliery Ground, Coalville (1957–1982)
 Ashby Road, Hinckley (1911–1937)
 Coventry Road, Hinckley (1951–1964)
 Leicester Road, Hinckley (1981–1991)
 Aylestone Road, Leicester (1901–1962)
 Brush Ground, Loughborough (1953–1965)
 College Ground, Loughborough (1928–1929)
 Park Road, Loughborough (1913–1970)
 Egerton Park, Melton Mowbray (1946–1948)

Players

Current squad
 No. denotes the player's squad number, as worn on the back of their shirt.
  denotes players with international caps.
  denotes a player who has been awarded a county cap.

Former captains

International players

England 
 Jonathan Agnew
 Ewart Astill
 Chris Balderstone
 Jack Birkenshaw
 Nigel Briers
 Stuart Broad
 Michael Carberry
 Nick Cook
 Eddie Dawson
 Phillip DeFreitas
 George Geary
 David Gower
 Aftab Habib
 Matthew Hoggard
 Ken Higgs
 Ray Illingworth
 John King
 Albert Knight
 Barry Knight

 Chris Lewis
 Tony Lock
 Darren Maddy
 Devon Malcolm
 Alan Mullally
 Tom New
 Paul Nixon
 Jimmy Ormond
 Charles Palmer
 Dick Pougher
 Jeremy Snape
 Peter Such
 James Taylor
 Les Taylor
 Roger Tolchard
 Willie Watson
 Vince Wells
 James Whitaker
 Peter Willey
 Luke Wright

Australia
   Michael Bevan
   Brad Hodge
   Michael Kasprowicz
   Andrew McDonald
   Garth McKenzie
   Mark Cosgrove

Bangladesh 
 Shakib Al Hasan

India
 Anil Kumble
 Virender Sehwag
 RP Singh
 Javagal Srinath
 Varun Aaron

New Zealand
 Stewie Dempster

Pakistan
 Mohammad Asif
 Shahid Afridi
 Abdul Razzaq
 Sohail Khan
 Mohammad Abbas

South Africa
 HD Ackerman
 Hansie Cronje
 HH Dippenaar
 Claude Henderson
 Charl Langeveldt
 Charl Willoughby

West Indies
 Winston Benjamin
 Vasbert Drakes
 Ottis Gibson
 Jermaine Lawson
 Andy Roberts
 Ramnaresh Sarwan
 Phil Simmons
 Jerome Taylor

Zimbabwe
 Neil Johnson

Records

Most first-class runs for Leicestershire 
Qualification – 17,000 runs

Most first-class wickets for Leicestershire 
Qualification – 600 wickets

Most first-team winners medals for Leicestershire

 J. C. Balderstone – 6

Batting
 Highest team total: 756-4d v. Sussex, Hove, 2022
 Highest home team total: 638-8d v. Worcestershire, Grace Road, 1996
 Lowest team total: 25 v. Kent, Leicester, 1912
 Highest total against: 761-6d by Essex, Chelmsford, 1990
 Lowest total against: 24 by Glamorgan, Leicester, 1971
 Highest individual score: 309* by HD Ackerman v. Glamorgan, Sophia Gardens, 2006.
 Highest home individual score: 262 by Brad Hodge v. Durham, Grace Road, 2004
 Highest partnership: 477* by C. N. Ackermann and P. W. A. Mulder v. Sussex, Hove, 2022

Best partnership for each wicket (county championship)
1st – 390 B. Dudleston and J. F. Steele v. Derbyshire, Leicester, 1979
2nd – 320 Hassan Azad and N. J. Dexter v. Gloucestershire, Leicester, 2019
3rd – 316* W. Watson and A. Wharton v. Somerset, Taunton, 1961
4th – 290* P. Willey and T. J. Boon v. Warwickshire, Leicester, 1984
5th – 477* C. N. Ackermann and P. W. A. Mulder v. Sussex, Hove, 2022
6th – 284 P. V. Simmons and P. A. Nixon v. Durham, Chester-le-Street, 1996
7th – 219* J. D. R. Benson and P. Whitticase v. Hampshire, Bournemouth, 1991
8th – 203* H. J Swindells and E. Barnes v. Somerset, Taunton, 2021
9th – 160 R. T. Crawford and W. W. Odell v. Worcestershire, Leicester, 1902
10th – 228 R. Illingworth and K. Higgs v. Northamptonshire, Leicester, 1977

Bowling
Most first-class wickets in a season: 170 by Jack Walsh, 1948
Best bowling figures in an innings: 10–18 by George Geary v. Glamorgan, Ynysangharad Park, Pontypridd, 1929
Best bowling figures in a match: 16–96 by George Geary

Fielding
Most dismissals in an innings: 7 by Neil Burns v. Somerset, Grace Road, 2001
Most dismissals in a match: 10 by Percy Corrall v. Sussex, Hove, 1936

Sub Academy
The Leicestershire Sub Academy is designed for young cricketers who have potential to play at the highest level. It is also called the EPP (Emerging Player Programme). Many players who are involved in this set up move on to the LCCC academy, where they will play matches against academies from other counties.

References

Further reading
H S Altham, A History of Cricket, Volume 1 (to 1914), George Allen & Unwin, 1962
Derek Birley, A Social History of English Cricket, Aurum, 1999
Rowland Bowen, Cricket: A History of its Growth and Development, Eyre & Spottiswoode, 1970
Roy Webber, The Playfair Book of Cricket Records, Playfair Books, 1951
Playfair Cricket Annual – various editions
Wisden Cricketers' Almanack – various editions

External links
Leicestershire County Cricket Club – Official Site
Friends of Grace Road - Supporters' Group
The Meet – Fan's Site
CricInfo Page
Cricket Archive Page 
BBC Sport Page

 
English first-class cricket teams
Sport in Leicester
Cricket clubs established in 1879
History of Leicestershire
1879 establishments in England
Cricket in Leicestershire